Oonagh Guinness (22 February 1910 – 2 August 1995) was an Anglo-Irish socialite, society hostess and art collector, and the second wife of Dominick Browne, 4th Baron Oranmore and Browne.

Early life
She was born on 22 February 1910, the youngest of the three daughters of Ernest Guinness (1876–1949) and  Marie Clothilde Russell (1880–1953), daughter of Sir George Russell, 4th Baronet.  Ernest Guinness was the second son of Edward Guinness, 1st Earl of Iveagh (1847–1927). She believed that she was "the favourite of her father's three blonde and blue-eyed daughters". Along with her two sisters, Aileen and Maureen, the Guinness sisters were celebrated as the Golden Guinness Girls of 1920s British society.

Public life
Oonagh was a prominent hostess, particularly after her second divorce in 1950, when the Luggala Estate became a centre of Irish social life. "Oonagh somehow imbued Luggala with enchantment. Nobody could keep away: Dublin intelligentsia, literati, painters, actors, scholars, hangers-on, toffs, punters, poets, social hang-gliders were attracted to Luggala as to nowhere else in Ireland — perhaps even in Europe, from where many would come. And the still centre of this exultant, exuberant chaos was Oonagh."

Personal life
At age 19, Oonagh was engaged to the Hon. Philip Kindersley, the second son of the banker Robert Kindersley, 1st Baron Kindersley, and her father gave her Luggala, an 18th-century hunting lodge in County Wicklow, an hour south of Dublin.

In 1929, she married the Hon. Philip Kindersley, and they had three children, though only one lived to reach adulthood: Gay Kindersley (1930–2011), National Hunt jockey and Jockey Club steward. The marriage was dissolved in 1936.

In 1936, she married Dominick Browne, 4th Baron Oranmore and Browne, and they had three children: Garech Domnagh Browne (1939–2018), an unnamed son (1943–1943), and Tara Browne (1945–1966), who died in a car accident. Oonagh and Dominick divorced in 1950.

From 1957 to 1965, she was married to Miguel Ferreras Aciro (1927–1999), a New York dress designer.

She died at Luggala on 2 August 1995.

References

1910 births
1995 deaths
Mereworth
Oranmore and Browne
British socialites
Oonagh
Kindersley family